Frank A. Southard Jr. (January 17, 1907November 25, 1989) was a senior official at the International Monetary Fund. He served as the deputy managing director of the fund from 1962 to 1974.

Early life
Southard graduated from Pomona College in 1927. He was awarded a Guggenheim Fellowship in 1940.

Further reading
Oral history interview with Southard

References

International Monetary Fund people
Pomona College alumni
1907 births
1989 deaths